The Anglican Diocese of Ogbomoso is one of 17 within the Anglican Province of Ibadan, itself one of 14 provinces within the Church of Nigeria. The current bishop is Matthew Osunade.

The diocese was established in 2005.

Notes

Church of Nigeria dioceses
Dioceses of the Province of Ibadan